Paul M. Lewis ( - died November 27, 1990) was an American entrepreneur and car builder. He built the Airomobile (1937), Fascination (1962), three Renault powered models, and an Oldsmobile Toronado-sourced V6.

Lewis moved to Denver from Idaho Springs, Colorado in 1933 to open a Vertical Take Off and Landing (VTOL) airplane company. He soon began constructing a mass market automobile with a three-wheeled layout. He partnered with former Franklin Motor Company engineers to design the engine. Production was sought with the Doman-Marks Engine Company, but in 1936 disputes with the Security and Exchange Commission (SEC) halted the project. The company went bankrupt in 1939.

Lewis tried again with Fascination in 1962. It was built by his Lakewood, Colorado company Highway Aircraft Corporation. It was intended as a futuristic 130 mile-per-hour automobilewith 180-degree turning capability. To build the planned vehicles he partnered with tractor cab manufacturer Egging Manufacturing Company of Gurley, Nebraska. He touted development of a Nobel Gas Plasma Engine for the car, but it never came to pass.

See also
Preston Tucker
Buckminster Fuller

References

1990 deaths
Lewis
People from Idaho Springs, Colorado